Dreadful Tales (2000) is a collection of short horror stories by American cult writer Richard Laymon. Published the year before his death it collects twenty-five stories, most previously published in magazines.

Stories (in order of arrangement)
Invitation to Murder
The Grab
Saving Grace
Barney's Bigfoot Museum
Herman
The Champion
The Maiden
A Good Cigar is a Smoke
I'm not a Criminal
Oscar's Audition
Into the Pit
Spooked
The Good Deed
The Direct Approach
Good Vibrations
Phil the Vampire
Paying Joe Back
The Fur Coat
Blarney
Dracuson's Driver
Roadside Pickup
Wishbone
First Date
Stickman
Mop Up

Reception
The collection received positive notices from the horror community, including Shivers, which said that it "knocks all other offerings for six and presents a consistent collection of tales, almost every one of which manages to shock, delight and horrify through numerous ideas, characters and situations... a breath of fresh air in the stale UK Horror climate... Gets my vote as the best of 2000 by a long chalk." (Although Laymon was an American writer, throughout his career his books were more popular in the United Kingdom, a fact he blamed on a botched, heavily-edited American release of his second novel, The Woods Are Dark.) Books Magazine called it a "terrifying collection of short stories that showcases the dark genius of a true master of the macabre."

References

Horror fiction
Novels by Richard Laymon